Marcus Lantz (born 23 October 1975) is a Swedish football manager and former professional footballer who played as a holding midfielder. A full international between 1998 and 2010, he played six matches for the Sweden national team.

Career 
Born in Kristianstad, Lantz started playing football with amateur club IFÖ/Bromölla IF. After one season, he moved on to Helsingborgs IF in the top-flight Allsvenskan championship. He helped Helsingborg win the 1998 Svenska Cupen and 1999 Allsvenskan titles and had a trial at English club Chelsea in December 1997, before he moved abroad in the winter 1999. After a short stop at Torino F.C. in Italy, where he had limited playing time, Lantz moved to FC Hansa Rostock in the Bundesliga championship in November 1999.

He was instantly a part of the Rostock first team line-up, and in his six seasons with the club, he played 164 league matches. While at Rostock, Lantz chose to play no longer for the Swedish national team. With his contract running out in the summer 2005, he left Rostock on a free transfer. He joined Danish club Brøndby IF, under manager Michael Laudrup. In his second season with Brøndby, Lantz suffered an injury, which received false treatment and kept him out for two months.

He moved back to Sweden and Helsingborgs IF on 31 August 2007 and signed a contract until 2011. After his contract ended he joined Landskrona BoIS in early 2011, where he played for two seasons finishing his playing career in the end of 2012.

Honours
Helsingborgs IF

 Allsvenskan: 1999
 Svenska Cupen: 1997–98, 2010

References

External links
 
 
  
  
 
 

1975 births
Living people
Swedish footballers
Sweden international footballers
FC Hansa Rostock players
Brøndby IF players
Helsingborgs IF players
Torino F.C. players
Landskrona BoIS players
Allsvenskan players
Bundesliga players
Danish Superliga players
Swedish expatriate footballers
Expatriate footballers in Italy
Expatriate footballers in Germany
Expatriate men's footballers in Denmark
Örgryte IS managers
Association football midfielders
Swedish football managers
Sweden youth international footballers
Sweden under-21 international footballers
Swedish expatriate sportspeople in Germany
Swedish expatriate sportspeople in Denmark
Swedish expatriate sportspeople in Italy
People from Bromölla Municipality
Footballers from Skåne County